Yu Yang (born 6 August 1989) is a Chinese professional footballer who last played for Chinese Super League club Beijing Guoan as a centre-back.

Club career
Yu Yang started his football career playing for Beijing Guoan's youth academy before eventually being promoted up to the senior squad and would go on to make his debut on 29 June 2008 in a 2-0 loss against Shanghai Shenhua. Yu would make four appearances at the end of the season; however, the following campaign he did not play in the team that won the 2009 top-tier league title. He would instead be loaned out to third-tier club Dalian Aerbin during the 2010 season and would go on to actually win the division title with the club. When Yu returned to Beijing at the beginning of the 2011 season, Jaime Pacheco was introduced as the new manager and he included him back into the first team. This saw him repay him by scoring his first goal for the club on 30 May 2011 against Shenzhen Ruby in a 4-0 win. While Yu only played in two league games throughout the 2011 season, Pacheco would go on make him a first team regular the following season.

On 9 December 2014, Yu transferred to fellow Chinese Super League side Guangzhou R&F. On 30 December 2016, Yu returned to Beijing Guoan. He would make is return appearance for the club in the first league game of the 2017 Chinese Super League season on 5 March 2017 against Guangzhou Evergrande in a game that ended in a 2-1 defeat. Throughout the season he would establish himself as a vital member of the team and in the following season help the club go on the win the 2018 Chinese FA Cup against Shandong Luneng. Yu left Guoan at the end of the 2022 Chinese Super League season when his contracted finished.

International career
Yu made his debut for the Chinese national team on 8 June 2012 in a 3-0 win against Vietnam.

Career statistics

Club statistics
Statistics accurate as of match played 26 February 2023.

International

Honours

Club
Beijing Guoan
Chinese Super League: 2009
Chinese FA Cup: 2018
Dalian Aerbin
China League Two: 2010

References

External links
Player profile at Sodasoccer.com
 

Player stats at Sohu.com

1989 births
Living people
Chinese footballers
Footballers from Tianjin
China international footballers
Beijing Guoan F.C. players
Dalian Professional F.C. players
Guangzhou City F.C. players
China League Two players
Chinese Super League players
Association football defenders
2019 AFC Asian Cup players